Samuel Appleton (June 22, 1766 – July 12, 1853) was an American merchant and philanthropist, active in New Hampshire, Massachusetts, and Great Britain.

Early life and education

Appleton was born in New Ipswich, New Hampshire, the great-great-grandson of another Samuel Appleton (1625 – May 15, 1696), who was a military and government leader in the Massachusetts Bay Colony and Province of Massachusetts Bay and a commander of the Massachusetts militia during King Philip's War who led troops during the Attack on Hatfield, Massachusetts and the Great Swamp Fight and also held numerous positions in government and was an opponent of Governor Sir Edmund Andros. His family had come there from Ipswich, Massachusetts and his relatives live there to the present-day.

Career
From 1790 to 1792, he cleared fields in Maine for farming. He also taught school. For a time he kept a store in Ipswich. In 1794, he moved to Boston, where he became an importer in partnership with his brother Nathan as S. & N. Appleton, buying European dry goods at auction and for resale to country traders in exchange for homespun cloth as well as pot and pearl ash for export to Britain. 

He later established cotton mills at Waltham and Lowell, Massachusetts. After 1799 he passed much of his time in Britain, and at age 53 married a widow, Mrs. Mary Gore, with whom he had no children. He retired from business in 1823.

After retirement, he devoted much of his fortune to charity, including his gift funding the Appleton Cabinet at Amherst College, built to house the Hitchcock Ichnological Cabinet, and the Appleton Chapel at Harvard University. He endowed the academy at New Ipswich with a fund which secured its permanence, and founded the professorship of natural philosophy of Dartmouth College, with a gift of $10,000.

Appleton served as a vestryman of King's Chapel from 1830 to 1840, and a monument to him sits on the north wall of the chapel. Wilson's biographical directory of Boston's business aristocracy, published 1848, noted that it was “to the credit of Samuel Appleton, that he commenced life with a single four-pence half penny, paid to him by a drover who passed his father's house, for assistance in driving [cattle].”

At his death, Appleton's fortune amounted to nearly $1,000,000, and he had given away nearly as much as that during his lifetime. By his will he placed property to the amount of $200,000 in the hands of his executors, “to be by them applied, disposed of, and distributed, for scientific, literary, religious, and charitable purposes.”

The Samuel Appleton Building located on 110-114 Milk Street, Boston is currently under study as a Boston Landmark by the Boston Landmarks Commission.

Historic ship
The 1846 ship Samuel Appleton was built by P. Curtis in Medford, Massachusetts and owned by Daniel Pinckney Parker, a Boston shipping merchant.

Notes

References 
 Mann, Anthony, "How 'poor country boys' became Boston Brahmins: The rise of the Appletons and the Lawrences in ante-bellum Massachusetts", Historical Journal of Massachusetts, Winter 2003.
 Peabody, Ephraim, "Notice of Samuel Appleton, Esq.", New England Historical and Genealogical Review, 8 (January, 1854), 12.
 Wilson, Thomas L V, The Aristocracy of Boston; who they are, and what they were; being a history of Business and Business Men of Boston, for the last forty years, Boston : Thomas Wilson, 1848.

External links

 
 

1766 births
1853 deaths
American philanthropists
Appleton family
Burials at Mount Auburn Cemetery
Colonial American merchants
People from New Ipswich, New Hampshire
People of colonial New Hampshire